Fancy Dancer is the fifth studio album by American jazz flautist Bobbi Humphrey, recorded in 1975 and released on the Blue Note label.

Reception
The Allmusic review by Thom Jurek awarded the album 4 stars, stating: "There isn't anything approaching a middling moment here -- this is all killer, no filler. Jazz critics may have had their troubles with this set, but no one cared; Humphrey and the Mizells were creating a new kind of largely instrumental funk that was inclusive of everything they could weave in from world music to soul-jazz to club music to pop -- and the public responded".

Track listing

 "Uno Esta" (Larry Mizell) - 6:44 
 "The Trip" (Chuck Davis, Doug Jones) - 5:41 
 "You Make Me Feel So Good" (Larry Mizell, Fonce Mizell) - 6:16 
 "Fancy Dancer" (Jerry Peters) - 5:46 
 "Mestizo Eyes" (Larry Mizell, Fonce Mizell, Warren Jordan) 4:52 
 "Sweeter Than Sugar" (Chuck Davis, Skip Scarborough) - 4:24 
 "Please Set Me at Ease" (Larry Mizell, Fonce Mizell, Ruby Mizell) - 6:09 
Recorded at The Sound Factory, Los Angeles, California on August 5 (tracks 2-4 & 7), August 6 (tracks 1 & 5), and August 7 (track 6), 1975

Personnel
Bobbi Humphrey - flute, vocals
Oscar Brashear - trumpet
Fonce Mizell - trumpet, clavinet, solina, vocals
Julian Priester - trombone
Tyree Glenn Jr. - tenor saxophone
Dorothy Ashby - harp
Roger Glenn - vibes, marimba
Chuck Davis - piano, electric piano
Skip Scarborough - piano, electric piano, clavinet
Jerry Peters - piano, electric piano, synthesizer
Larry Mizell - synthesizer, solina, piano, electric piano, vocals
Craig McMullen, John Rowin - guitar
Chuck Rainey - electric bass
Harvey Mason  - drums
Mayuto Correa - conga
Jesse Acuna, Rosario Davila, Katherine Lyra, Augie Rey, Sonia Tavares - backing vocals
James Carter - whistler

In popular culture
Hip-hop artists Curren$y and Wiz Khalifa sampled the music from Fancy Dancer for their 2013 EP entitled Live In Concert.

References 

Blue Note Records albums
Bobbi Humphrey albums
1975 albums
Albums produced by the Mizell Brothers
Jazz-funk albums